Splash! is a British television show which teaches celebrities the art of diving with the aid of Olympic diver Tom Daley. The second series began broadcasting on 4 January 2014 and ended on 15 February 2014. Gabby Logan and Vernon Kay returned to present, alongside resident judges Andy Banks, Jo Brand and Leon Taylor.

Contestants
Rav Wilding was due to compete in the series but had to pull out before the series began due to injury, and was replaced by Martin Offiah. The line-up for the first heat was revealed on 23 December 2013, the line-up for the second heat was revealed at the end of the 4 January 2014 show. The line-up for the third heat was revealed on 8 January 2014.

Scoring chart

Red numbers indicate the lowest score for each week
Green numbers indicate the highest score for each week
 indicates the celebrities eliminated each week
 indicates the celebrities in the Splash!-off each week

"—" indicates that the celebrity did not dive that week

Average chart
This table only counts for dives scored on a traditional 30-points scale.

Live show details

Heat 1 (4 January)

Judges' votes to save
 Brand: Gemma Collins
 Banks: Michaela Strachan
 Taylor: Michaela Strachan

Heat 2 (11 January)

Judges' votes to save
 Taylor: Anna Williamson
 Brand: Toyah Willcox
 Banks: Anna Williamson

Heat 3 (18 January)

Judges' votes to save
 Brand: Danielle Lloyd
 Banks: Danielle Lloyd
 Taylor: Danielle Lloyd

Heat 4 (25 January)

Judges' votes to save
 Taylor: Austin Healey
 Brand: Austin Healey
 Banks: Austin Healey

Semi-final 1 (1 February)

Judges' votes to save
 Banks: Keith Duffy 
 Brand: Danielle Lloyd
 Taylor: Keith Duffy

Semi-final 2 (8 February)

* Due to injury Healey did not take part in the live show and therefore had to withdraw from the competition.

Judges' votes to save
 Taylor: Dan Osborne
 Brand: Anna Williamson
 Banks: Dan Osborne

Final (15 February)

Ratings

References

2014 in British television
2014 British television seasons